Ellingen is a town in the Weißenburg-Gunzenhausen district, in Bavaria, Germany.

History
It was first mentioned in 899. From 1216 - 1806 it was capital of the Franconian branch of the Teutonic Order and at least for some years residence of the order's grandmaster at the end of 18th century. At the end of WW II Ellingen was bombed by US Airforce although it had no military or industrial importance.
The town has a baroque palace, Ellingen Residence, and several other baroque and rococo  buildings. The Swabian Rezat (river) flows through Ellingen.

Transport
Ellingen has a railway station at the Nuremberg - Treuchtlingen - Augsburg line. By the Bundesstraße 2 and 13 it is well connected to Nuremberg (B2), Augsburg (B2), Ingolstadt (B13) and Ansbach (B13).

The list of the personalities of the city of Ellingen includes the name of Ellingen, a town in the Landkreis Weißenburg-Gunzenhausen, born personalities as well as those who enter the city because, for example, they had their (main) effect here without being born there. All sections are sorted chronologically according to the year of birth. The list does not claim to be complete.

Sons and daughters of the city
 Eitel Klein (1906-1990), painter and graphic artist from Hörlbach

People associated with the place

 Maximilian Friedrich von Königsegg-Rothenfels (1708-1784), bishop
 Rudolf Kleiner (1758-1822), German lawyer and administrative officer
 Carl Philipp von Wrede (1767-1838), Bavarian general field marshal and diplomat
 Herbert Lang (born 1936), German Catholic priest and historian, pastor in Ellingen

References

Weißenburg-Gunzenhausen